La Pointe is an unincorporated community in the town of La Pointe, Ashland County, Wisconsin, United States. It is on the western shore of Madeline Island, the largest of the Apostle Islands. Downtown La Pointe is adjacent to the Madeline Island Ferry dock. La Pointe has a post office with ZIP code 54850.

While the area encompassing the Town of La Pointe is made up of the entire Apostle Islands archipelago, the residents of the community live almost exclusively on Madeline Island because it is the only Apostle Island open to commercial development. The United States Census Bureau does not publish population figures specific to the unincorporated community, but the surrounding town had a population of 428 in the 2020 census.

History
According to William Whipple Warren's History of the Ojibway People (18xx), Moningwunakuaning "is the spot on which the Ojibway tribe first grew, and like a tree it has spread its branches in every direction, in the bands that now [1885] occupy the vast extent of the Ojibway earth; and also that 'it is the root from which all the far scattered villages of the tribe have sprung.'"

La Pointe was originally the site of a fortified French trading post from 1693 to 1698 and from 1718 to 1759. The current city began to develop in the late 18th century as an American Fur Company outpost under the leadership of Michel Cadotte.

Warren, whose mother was French-Ojibwa, learned from maternal tribal elders that the Ojibwa originally lived near the mouth of the St. Lawrence River. At the time of great sickness and death, the Great Spirit interceded through Manabosho, a common uncle of the Anishinubag (spontaneous people). Through the discovery of the snakeroot they were granted the rite, enabled through their Medawe (religion), "wherewith life is restored and prolonged." The great Megis (seashell) showed itself as a glossy thing reflecting on the sea. It led them first to a place near Montreal where they stayed for some time. Next it led them to Boweting (Sault Ste. Marie); again they stayed for some time. At last it led them to Moningwunakauning (La Pointe, Madeline Island), "where it has ever since reflected back the rays of the sun, and blessed our ancestors with life, light and wisdom," says Warren. So the flickering shaft of light is the Megis, and La Pointe is the center of the Earth for the Ojibwa.

Kechewaishke, commonly known as Chief Buffalo, was an Ojibwa leader born at La Pointe in 1759. Recognized as the principal chief of the Lake Superior Chippewa (Ojibwa) for nearly a half-century until his death in 1855, he led his nation into a treaty relationship with the United States Government, signing treaties in 1825, 1826, 1837, 1842, 1847, and 1854. He was also instrumental in resisting the efforts of the United States to remove the Ojibwa and in securing permanent reservations for his people near Lake Superior.

Licensed Indian traders operated at this location and nearby stores at Lac Courte Oreilles Reservation and other convenient places.

Today, the town's history is preserved at Madeline Island Historical Museum.

Tourism
Tourism makes up a large part of the local economy. La Pointe, like Bayfield (on the mainland), has become a popular tourist destination during the summer, when many local events are scheduled.

Downtown La Pointe offers many bars, restaurants, and other amenities. Camping, swimming, hiking, and other outdoor recreational activities are abundant and popular on the island.

Travel

Madeline Island and the town of La Pointe are accessible by the Madeline Island Ferry line. The steel-hulled car/passenger ferries depart from Bayfield on a set schedule. Many attractions on the island are within walking distance of the ferry dock, such as the museum and library. It may be necessary to bring a vehicle to reach attractions that are farther away, such as Big Bay State Park. County Highway H serves as a main route in the community.

There is also a public boat marina near the ferry dock.

Ground transportation to the island during the winter (late December through February) is by way of an ice road, which is open when ice levels are safe enough for vehicles to pass.

The Major Gilbert Field Airport  is a general aviation airport that features a 3,000-foot by 75-foot landing strip, as well as overnight tie-downs and an array of other services. The airport is publicly-owned by the Town of La Pointe.

Notable people
Kechewaishke, Native American leader
Michel Cadotte, prominent fur trader
Ozhaguscodaywayquay, noted Native American businesswoman
Thomas D. O'Brien, Justice of the Minnesota Supreme Court
William Whipple Warren, Minnesota Territory legislator

Gallery

See also
 Islands of the Midwest
 Islands of the Great Lakes
 Populated islands of the Great Lakes

References

External links
Jalbert, Andrew J. Schooner Lucerne: Lessons from a Great Lakes Shipwreck (July 27, 2007) SEA HISTORY magazine, The Wreck of the Schooner Lucerne.
Official website for the Town of La Pointe
Madeline Island Chamber of Commerce
Madeline Island from Wisconsin Historical Society
Madeline Island Ferry Line
Big Bay State Park

Towns in Ashland County, Wisconsin
Former county seats in Wisconsin
Piers in Wisconsin
Apostle Islands
Towns in Wisconsin